The BMW 700 is a small rear-engined  car which was produced by BMW in various models from August 1959 to November 1965. It was the first BMW automobile with a monocoque structure.  The 700 was a sales success at a time when BMW was close to financial ruin.  The 700 was also successful in its class in motorsport, both in its stock form and as the basis of a racing special called the 700RS.

More than 188,000 were sold before production ended in November 1965. Upon discontinuing the 700, BMW left the economy car market.

Concept, design, and engineering
Wolfgang Denzel, the distributor of BMW cars in Austria, commissioned Giovanni Michelotti to prepare concept sketches based on a lengthened BMW 600 chassis. In January 1958, Denzel was awarded a development contract for the 700. Denzel presented a prototype to BMW's management in July 1958. The concept, a two-door coupé with a slanted roof,  was generally well received, but objections were raised about the limited passenger space. BMW decided to produce two versions, the coupe, and a two-door sedan with a taller, longer roof.

The engineer responsible for the chassis and suspension was Willy Black, who had designed and engineered the 600. The drivetrain and suspension were similar to those of the 600, with a rear-mounted flat-twin engine powering the rear wheels, leading arm suspension at the front, and semi trailing arm suspension at the rear. The 700 used a steel monocoque structure, and was the first BMW automobile to do so.

The engine was an enlarged version of that used in the R67 motorcycle and the 600.

Reception
The coupé and saloon versions of the 700 were shown at the 1959 Frankfurt Motor Show. BMW's internal model code was E107, with the later cabriolet becoming the E110. After the show, BMW received 25,000 orders for 700s.  Production of the BMW 700 coupe began in August 1959, with the saloon version following in December.

The large number of orders was welcome news for BMW, which was in a financial crisis. In December 1959, shareholders blocked a proposal by BMW's supervisory board to sell BMW to Daimler-Benz. The subsequent heavy investment in BMW by Herbert Quandt has been attributed in part to the success of the 700.

By April 1960, production of the 700 was at 155 cars per day. In five years of production, 188,211 BMW 700s were built.

Development
The first variant of the 700 to appear after the original coupé and saloon was the 700 Sport in August 1960. Available only as a coupé, the Sport used an uprated engine with a pair of Solex carburetors and a 9.0:1 compression ratio. The Sport also had a rear anti-roll bar. A ribbed oil pan was used to reduce the oil temperature of the more powerful engine. The 700 Sport was renamed the 700 CS in 1963.

The 700 Cabriolet was introduced shortly after the 700 Sport, and was available only with the Sport's 40 horsepower engine. The convertible body was made by Karosserie Baur of Stuttgart. 2,592 convertibles were built.

A Saxomat semi-automatic transmission was offered as an option on 700s from September 1960.

The 700 Luxus (deluxe) replaced the original saloon in 1962.

In February 1963, the size of the inlet valves in the 700's base engine was increased.

The final development of the 700 was the 700 LS Coupé of 1964. This was a long-wheelbase coupé with the Sport engine. 1,730 LS Coupés were built.

Production of the BMW 700 ended in November 1965.  By that time, the successful New Class cars had established themselves in the marketplace. High demand for these larger cars with larger profit margins led BMW to stop making economy cars. BMW eventually returned to the economy car market in 2002 with the Mini.

An attempt to transfer the rights to body production and export markets of the 700 to Autocars Co. in Israel in 1965 fell through. E. Illin Industries had earlier tried to start an enterprise in assembling 700s in Israel, which resulted in four 700s being assembled there in April 1963. The 700 was assembled in Argentina by Metalmecánica SAIC and sold as a De Carlo 700 Glamour until 1964 when the same running gear was clothed with a Simca 1000 look-alike body as the De Carlo SL. A small number of coupés were assembled there in 1961.

Motorsport

Several racing drivers competed in BMW 700s. Hans Stuck won the 1960 German Hillclimb Championship in a 700. Stuck and Sepp Grieger drove another to a class victory at the 1960 Hockenheim 12-hour race. Walter Schneider and Leo Levine raced a 700 to a class victory at the Nürburgring six-hour touring car race in 1960. Schneider went on to win the 1961 German saloon car title. Also in 1961, a BMW 700 won its class at Monza, beating their greatest rival Abarth on their home ground. Other drivers competing in 700s included Jacky Ickx, Hubert Hahne, and Alpina founder Burkard Bovensiepen.

700 RS
The 700 RS was a sports racing car based on the 700. Hans Stuck campaigned the 700RS with success.

References
Citations

Sources

External links

700
Rear-engined cars
Cars powered by boxer engines
1960s cars
Cars introduced in 1959
Touring cars
Cars powered by 2-cylinder engines